Milan Kytnár (born May 19, 1989) is a Slovak professional ice hockey forward who is currently playing with HC Slovan Bratislava of the Slovak Extraliga (Slovak). He was selected by the Edmonton Oilers in the 5th round (127th overall) of the 2007 NHL Entry Draft.

Playing career
Prior to coming to North America, Kytnár played professionally in Slovakia with HC Topoľčany during the 2006-07 season. He moved to Canada to follow his NHL aspirations and played major junior hockey in the Western Hockey League with the Kelowna Rockets, Saskatoon Blades and the Vancouver Giants.

On May 31, 2009, the Edmonton Oilers signed Kytnár to a three-year, entry-level contract. He made his North American professional debut with the Oilers American Hockey League affiliate, the Oklahoma City Barons in the 2010-11 season, collected 13 goals and 29 points in 78 regular season games.

In the 2011–12 season, on January 11, 2012, Kytnár made his NHL debut, playing 5:31 of ice time and recording one shot on goal, with the Edmonton Oilers in a 2-1 overtime loss to the New Jersey Devils. It was his only career game in the NHL before he was returned to finish out his contract in the minor leagues and accepting a loan to return to Europe, agreeing to a stint in Finland with HPK of the Liiga.

Career statistics

Regular season and playoffs

International

Awards and honors

References

External links

1989 births
Living people
HC '05 Banská Bystrica players
Edmonton Oilers draft picks
Edmonton Oilers players
HPK players
HC Karlovy Vary players
Kelowna Rockets players
HC Nové Zámky players
Oklahoma City Barons players
Sportspeople from Topoľčany
Saskatoon Blades players
Slovak ice hockey centres
HC Slovan Bratislava players
Stockton Thunder players
Vancouver Giants players
HKM Zvolen players
Slovak expatriate ice hockey players in the United States
Slovak expatriate ice hockey players in Canada
Slovak expatriate ice hockey players in the Czech Republic
Slovak expatriate ice hockey players in Finland